What Price Glory? may refer to:

What Price Glory? (1926 film), directed by Raoul Walsh
What Price Glory (1952 film), directed by John Ford
What Price Glory? (play), a 1924 play by Maxwell Anderson and Laurence Stallings; basis for both films
What Price Glory?!, a role-playing game